Agriophara cinderella is a moth in the family Depressariidae. It was described by Newman in 1856. It is found in Australia, where it has been recorded from Victoria and New South Wales.

The wingspan is about 35 mm. The forewings are ashy-grey, irrorated with black, the disc with several short black streaks. There is a curved series of lunate blackish spots near the hindmargin and a hindmarginal row of black dots. The hindwings are paler grey.

References

Moths described in 1856
Agriophara
Moths of Australia